The Department for Energy Security and Net Zero (DESNZ) is a department of His Majesty's Government established on 7 February 2023 after a government reshuffle, the first by prime minister Rishi Sunak. The new department took on the energy policy responsibilities of the former Department for Business, Energy, and Industrial Strategy (BEIS).

The department's first Secretary of State is Grant Shapps. He was previously the final Secretary of State at BEIS.

History
The department was established on 7 February 2023.

The creation of the new department was described by Downing Street as an opportunity to "focus on giving the UK cheaper, cleaner, more secure sources of energy – cutting bills, cutting emissions, and cutting dependence on international energy supplies."

The London School of Economics's Grantham Research Institute on Climate Change and the Environment welcomed the creation of the new department saying that it "signalled a commitment to delivering net zero" and "showed that MPs on the right of the Conservative Party have failed to win the argument for weakening climate policy." However, the LSE warned that the new department would have to "persuade other departments and the Treasury to accelerate action on cutting greenhouse gas emissions across the economy outside the energy sector" to be effective.

Responsibilities
The department's immediate priorities were outlined by the Prime Minister as follows:
 To maintain energy supplies, particularly during the winter.
 To reduce energy bills and lower inflation.
 To ensure the UK is on track to meet its legally binding carbon budgets and Net Zero commitments.
 To significantly speeding up delivery of network infrastructure and green energy.
 To improve the energy efficiency of UK homes, businesses and public sector buildings.
 To deliver a new Energy Bill by the end of the Parliament.

Ministers
Ministers in the department in February 2023:

See also
Department for Business, Energy, and Industrial Strategy - preceding body from 2016 to 2023.
Department of Energy and Climate Change - similar body from 2008 to 2016.
Department of Energy - historic body with similar responsibilities from 1974 to 1992.

References

External links
 Official webpage on GOV.UK
Making Government Deliver: Updating the machinery of government for the world of today and of tomorrow policy paper forwarded by Rishi Sunak explaining the rationale for the department.

Climate change ministries
Energy ministries
Energy in the United Kingdom
Ministries established in 2023
2023 establishments in the United Kingdom
Climate change policy in the United Kingdom